In algebraic geometry, local uniformization is a weak form of resolution of singularities, stating roughly that a variety can be desingularized near any valuation, or in other words that the Zariski–Riemann space of the variety is in some sense nonsingular.

Local uniformization of a variety at a valuation of its function field means finding a projective model of the variety such that the center of the valuation is non-singular. This is weaker than resolution of singularities: if there is a resolution of singularities then this is a model such that the center of every valuation is non-singular.  proved that if one can show local uniformization of a variety then one can find a finite number of models such that every valuation has a non-singular center on at least one of these models. To complete a proof of resolution of singularities it is then sufficient to show that one can combine these finite models into a single model, but this seems rather hard. 
(Local uniformization at a valuation does not directly imply resolution at the center of the valuation: roughly speaking; it only implies resolution in a sort of "wedge" near this point, and it seems hard to combine the resolutions of different wedges into a resolution at a point.)

 proved local uniformization of varieties in any dimension over fields of characteristic 0, and used this to prove resolution of singularities for varieties in characteristic 0 of dimension at most 3. Local uniformization in positive characteristic seems to be much harder.  proved local uniformization in all characteristic for surfaces and in characteristics at least 7 for 3-folds, and was able to deduce global resolution of singularities in these cases from this.   simplified Abhyankar's long proof.  extended Abhyankar's proof of local uniformization of 3-folds to the remaining characteristics 2, 3, and 5.  showed that it is possible to find a local uniformization of any valuation after taking a purely inseparable extension of the function field.

Local uniformization in positive characteristic for varieties of dimension at least 4 is (as of 2019) an open problem.

References

 (1998 2nd edition)

External links

Algebraic geometry
Singularity theory